The Jewish Council for Education & Research (JCER) is a federal Super PAC that has the purpose of developing and disseminating political information to United States voters.

They endorsed Barack Obama for the 2012 election and believed that "his administration has made significant progress towards fulfilling the pledges he made during his campaign."

References

Jewish political organizations